John Lancelot Lithgow (13 July 1933 – 1 March 2004) was a New Zealand politician of the National Party who later joined ACT.

Biography

Lithgow was born in Wanganui in 1933. He was educated at Wanganui Collegiate School and Lincoln University.

He represented the Palmerston North electorate in Parliament from 1975, when he defeated the incumbent Joe Walding by 148 votes.  At the 1978 election, Joe Walding won back the electorate for Labour. Lithgow was very much perceived as a 'Muldoon man' by voters, and Muldoon became very unpopular in Palmerston North by 1978 leading to Palmerston North electors seeing a vote for Walding as a rejection of Muldoon costing Lithgow his seat.

Lithgow left Palmerston North for Auckland two months after the 1978 election, where he found employment. He later moved to Wanganui, where he became a Wanganui city councillor.

Lithgow died on 1 March 2004.

References

1933 births
2004 deaths
ACT New Zealand politicians
Lincoln University (New Zealand) alumni
New Zealand city councillors
New Zealand National Party MPs
People educated at Whanganui Collegiate School
Place of death missing
Unsuccessful candidates in the 1996 New Zealand general election
Unsuccessful candidates in the 1978 New Zealand general election
Members of the New Zealand House of Representatives
New Zealand MPs for North Island electorates